J.P. Stevens may refer to:

J.P. Stevens Textile Corporation, a constituent corporation of WestPoint Home
J.P. Stevens High School, named after the founder of the above
John Paul Stevens (1920-2019) American Associate Justice of the Supreme Court of the United States
John Peters Stevens, American textile industrialist